Nyctochroa is a monotypic moth genus in the subfamily Arctiinae. Its single species, Nyctochroa basiplaga, is found in Mexico. Both the genus and species were first described by Felder in 1874.

References

Lithosiini